Catherine, Kathryn, Kate, Cathy, or variation, Fleming, may refer to:

People
 Katherine Fleming (16th century), mother of Edward Butler, 1st Viscount Galmoye and daughter-heiress of Thomas Fleming, 10th Baron Slane
 Katherine Fleming (1870–1939), U.S. singer and wife of conductor and composer Gustav Hinrichs
 Kate Fleming (1965–2006; born as Kathryn Ann Fleming), U.S. singer-actress
 Katherine Elizabeth Fleming (born 1965), U.S. professor of Hellenic studies
 Kathy Fleming (born 1967), U.S. middle distance runner
 Kate Fleming, sister of Lucy Fleming, and co-director of Ian Fleming Publications

Characters
 Detective Kate Fleming (DS, DI), a fictional character from BBC TV show Line of Duty

See also
 Catherine Flemming (born 1967) German actress
 Katie Fleming Needham (1844–1927), daughter of George Needham (teacher)
 Fleming (disambiguation)